is a town located in Kurate District, Fukuoka Prefecture, Japan.

The town has an estimated population of 15,563 and a density of 440 persons per km2. The total area is 35.60 km2.

References

External links

Kurate official website 

Towns in Fukuoka Prefecture